Jamesburg may refer to:
 Jamesburg, California
 Jamesburg, New Jersey

es:Jamesburg